The flag of Finland, also called  ("Blue Cross Flag"), dates from the beginning of the 20th century. On a white background, it features a blue Nordic cross, which represents Christianity.

The state flag has a coat of arms in the centre but is otherwise identical to the civil flag. The swallow-tailed state flag is used by the military. The presidential standard is identical to the swallow-tailed state flag but also has in its upper left corner the Cross of Liberty after the Order of the Cross of Liberty, which has the president of Finland as its grand master. Like Sweden's, Finland's national flag is based on the Scandinavian cross. It was adopted after independence from Russia, when many patriotic Finns wanted a special flag for their country, but its design dates back to the 19th century. The blue colouring is said to represent the country's thousands of lakes and the sky, with white for the snow that covers the land in winter. This colour combination has also been used over the centuries in various Finnish provincial, military, and town flags.

History

The first known "Flag of Finland" was presented in 1848, along with the unofficial national anthem "". Its motif was the coat of arms of Finland, surrounded by laurel leaves, on a white flag.

The current blue-crossed design was first used in Finland by Nyländska Jaktklubben, a yacht club founded in Helsinki in 1861. In addition to the blue cross on the white background, the yacht club flag had the crowned arms of the province of Uusimaa within two crossed branches in the upper hoist quarter. Except for the position of the cross, the flag was similar to the flag of the St. Petersburg Yacht Club, founded the previous year. The design can be traced to the Russian Navy ensign, which has a blue cross saltire on a white background. During the Crimean War, Finnish merchant ships captured by the British-French fleet flew a flag called Flag of St. George, which was based on the Russian Customs flag. In this variant, the cross was thinner than in the modern flag, and the proportions were equal. Another blue-cross flag was made official in 1861 for private vessels.

In 1910, in connection with Russification of Finland, the Russian authorities decreed that a Russian flag was to be added to the canton. However, this was met with resistance; the flag was derided as the "slave's flag", and most Finns refused to fly it. Instead, a triangular pennant without this modification was flown, thereby circumventing the decree concerning flags.

Shortly after Finland gained independence in 1917, a competition was held for the design of the Finnish flag. Several different designs were submitted. Regarding the colours, the entries fell mainly into two categories – one using the red and yellow from the Finnish coat of arms, and the other using the present blue and white colours.

One entry had the Dannebrog cross design, but with a yellow cross on a red background. Another entry had diagonal blue and white stripes, but it was criticized[by whom?] as being more suitable for a barber shop than a newly independent country. Akseli Gallen-Kallela proposed a similar cross flag, but with colours inverted (white cross on blue), but this was considered too similar to the Swedish flag and particularly the Greek flag of the time. Finally, artists Eero Snellman and Bruno Tuukkanen specified the final form of the flag. According to tradition, the flag was based on a design by the poet Zachris Topelius in about 1860.

The Finnish state flag was further modified in 1922 when the coronet was removed, and again in 1978 when the shield-shaped coat of arms was changed into a rectangular shape.

Legal definition

Size
Under Finnish law, the ratio of the flag is 11:18 (height:width), very close to the golden ratio. The swallow-tailed state flag is one unit longer and the tails are five units long. The cusp width of the blue cross is three units of measure, giving a ratio set of 4:3:4 (vertical) and 5:3:10 (horizontal). When flown from a flagpole, the flag is recommended to have a width equalling one-sixth of the height of the pole.

Usage

The Finnish flag is used in three main variants. The usual national flag is used by all citizens, organizations and Finnish municipalities and regions. Anyone is allowed to fly the national flag whenever they deem it suitable. The rectangular state flag is used by bodies of the Finnish national and provincial governments, by the cathedral chapters of the two national churches (Evangelical Lutheran and Orthodox), and non-naval vessels of the state.

The swallow-tailed national flag, which is also the naval ensign, is flown by the Finnish Defence Forces. The presidential standard and the command signs of the minister of defence, chief of defence, and commander of the Finnish Navy are flown only by the respective persons.

All public bodies as well as most private citizens and corporations fly the flag on official flag flying days. In addition to the official flag flying days, there are about ten unofficial but generally observed flag flying days. Besides flag flying days, normally, no flags or corporate flags are flown. Flag Day is celebrated on Midsummer's Day.

The Finnish flag is raised at 8 am and lowered at sunset, however not later than 9 pm. On Independence Day, the flag is flown until 8 pm, regardless of the dark. On the occasion of great national tragedies, the Ministry of The Interior may recommend flying the flag at half-mast throughout the country.

As a special custom in Finland, the flag is flown at Midsummer from 6 pm of Midsummer eve until 9 pm of Midsummer's day. This is done to symbolize the fact that the darkness does not come to any part of Finland during Midsummer's Night. Midsummer is also celebrated as the day of the Finnish flag.

Colours 
The colours are defined in both CIE 1931 and CIE 1976 standards, Swedish standard  and by the Pantone Color Matching System:

There is no official RGB definition for the colours because its color gamut is too narrow. From the CIE L*a*b* colors the unofficial approximations in sRGB are (range 0–255): blue R=24, G=68, B=126, red R=181, G=28, B=49 and yellow R=237, G=167, B=0. The yellow colour actually lies outside the sRGB colourspace. The blue colour is called "sea blue", which is a dark to medium blue. It is not very dark navy blue, and not any bright or greenish shade such as turquoise or cyan. It may be substituted for heraldic tincture azure.

Red and yellow are used in the coat of arms that appears on the state flag.

Other rules
Under Finnish law, it is forbidden to deface the flag or to use it in a disrespectful way. It is also illegal to remove a flag from its pole without permission. Anyone who breaks these regulations may be fined for disgracing the flag.

Finnish law also forbids the use of the presidential standard or state flag without permission, as well as the addition of any extra symbols to the flag. One may not sell a flag which has different colours or geometry than defined by the law. These are considered violations of the flag regulations and can lead to a fine.

There are also common rules on how to treat the flag respectfully. The flag must not be dirty or damaged. The flag must never touch the ground. When the flag is washed, it must be dried indoors. A worn-out flag must be disposed of by burning (though not with the intent to disgrace it), or alternatively by cutting it to pieces small enough not to be recognizable as parts of the flag. The flag must not be buried in the ground or the sea (including not throwing it into the garbage).

In Finland, the official term for flying a flag at half-mast is known as suruliputus (mourning by flag(ging)). It is performed by raising the flag briefly to the top of the mast and lowering it approximately one-third of the length of the flagpole, placing the lower hoist corner at half-mast. On wall-mounted and roof-top flagpoles the middle of the flag should fly at the middle of the flagpole. When removing the flag from half-mast, it is briefly hoisted to the finial before lowering completely. 

Traditionally, private residences and apartment houses fly the national flag at half-mast on the day of the death of a resident, when the flag is displayed at half-mast until sunset or 21:00, whichever comes first. Flags are also flown at half-mast on the day of the burial, with the exception that the flag is to be hoisted to the finial after the inhumation takes place.

Flags are also to be flown at half-mast by government agencies and embassies across the World on the days of national mourning, and "the entire nation is asked to join in." Such days are the deaths of former or current Finnish presidents, as well as significant catastrophic events such as the aftermath of 2004 Indian Ocean earthquake and tsunami, 2011 Norway attacks and significant national events such as the 2004 Konginkangas bus disaster and school shootings of Jokela and Kauhajoki.

Historically, flags were flown at half-mast on the Commemoration Day of Fallen Soldiers which takes place on the third Sunday of May. Originally, flag was raised to the finial in the morning, displayed at half-mast from 10:00 to 14:00, and again raised to the finial for the rest of the day. In 1995, the 50th anniversary of the end of the Second World War, the tradition of flying the flag at half-mast was discontinued and flag is displayed at the finial in a usual manner.

Yachting club ensigns
A Finnish speciality is that any yachting club registered in Finland may apply to have a flag with the club emblem officially approved for use on yachts. Such an ensign will be the civil ensign with a white cross,  of a unit-wide, superimposed on the blue cross and with the club emblem in the upper hoist corner. Most yachting clubs distribute these ensigns to their members, and they are much used, but their use is not recommended outside Finnish waters to avoid confusion. Officially, however, the yachting club ensign is valid even for international use.

Historical flags

Proposals

See also

 90th Anniversary of the Finnish Flag commemorative coin
 Nordic Cross flag
 Flag flying days in Finland
 Coat of arms of Finland
 Holidays in Finland
 National anthem of Finland
 Finnish national symbols
 Household pennants of Finland
 Raising the Flag on the Three-Country Cairn

References

External links

 Finnish Ministry of the Interior: Flag and arms of Finland
 

National flags
 
National symbols of Finland
Nordic Cross flags
1918 establishments in Finland
Flags introduced in 1918
Flags of the Arctic